Dörthe Tetzlaff is a German hydrologist who is Professor of Ecohydrology at Humboldt University zu Berlin and Head of Department at the Leibniz-Institute of Freshwater Ecology and Inland Fisheries, Berlin, Germany. Tetzlaff was appointed Fellow of the American Geophysical Union in 2018 and Honorary Fellow of the Geological Society of America in 2019.

Early life and education 
Tetzlaff studied geography at the University of Potsdam. She moved to the University of Hanover for graduate studies, where she earned a diploma in physical geography. Her master's dissertation involved investigating runoff generation and groundwater recharge at Ripple Creek Pass. Tetzlaff moved to the University of Freiburg as a doctoral researcher, undertaking a hydrological assessment of flow dynamics in urban rivers. She performed an ecohydrological assessment of the impact of urbanisation on discharge regimes. After completing her doctorate, Tetzlaff was appointed as a postdoctoral research fellow at the University of Aberdeen. During her postdoc she became interested in aquatic ecohydrology, studying hydrological influences on the ecology of Atlantic salmon.

Research and career 
In 2007, Tetzlaff joined the faculty at the University of Aberdeen. She was promoted to Professor of Hydrology in 2010. Aberdeen awarded her a Doctor of Science in Hydrology in 2013.

Tetzlaff's research involves ecohydrology, the connection between rivers and landscapes, and stable isotope hydrology. The stable isotopes can be used to better understand waters; specifically to quantify the internal processes of water storage, transmission and release.

Awards and honours 
 2017 Elected Fellow of the Royal Society of Edinburgh
 2018 Elected Fellow of the American Geophysical Union
 2019 Elected Honorary Fellow of the Geological Society of America
 2020 Elected Fellow of the Geological Society of America

Selected publications

References 

German women geologists
Living people
Year of birth missing (living people)
University of Potsdam alumni
University of Hanover alumni
University of Freiburg alumni
21st-century German geologists
Women hydrologists